Cherlak (Sarlaq) is a rural locality (a selo) and the administrative centre of Cherlakovsky  Selsoviet, Dyurtyulinsky District, Bashkortostan, Russia. The population was 584 as of 2010. There are 7 streets.

Geography 
Cherlak is located 38 km north of Dyurtyuli (the district's administrative centre) by road. Yusupovo is the nearest rural locality.

References 

Rural localities in Dyurtyulinsky District